Sheikh Hasina International Cricket Stadium  or The Boat is an under-construction cricket stadium located in Sector-I of multi-billion dollar Purbachal New Town on the outskirts of Dhaka, Bangladesh. The stadium is a joint venture of National Sports Council and Bangladesh Cricket Board. Planned to open in 2026, the stadium will serve as the home to Bangladesh national cricket team and Dhaka Dynamites of Bangladesh Premier League (BPL).

Overview
SHICS will be developed as a multi-function area. Other than a cricket stadium, the complex will also have indoor sports and water sports facilities. Other than the sports facilities, transit-oriented development with a five-star hotel would be developed in the stadium area. An outer stadium with a capacity of at least 2,500 spectators will also be developed which can be used for art performances besides sports.

The stadium is being constructed in Sector I of Purbachal New Town, in close proximity to multi-billion dollars Iconic City development project. The stadium will have five-storied pavilion, 3-tier stands with a capacity of 50,000, and the option to add at least 25,000 additional seats. The budget for the development of the stadium is estimated at 1300-crores ($140 million), making it the most expensive cricket stadium in Asia. From the budget, 37 crores were allocated towards the development of a separate practice facility for Bangladesh national cricket team.

Development
Groundbreaking of the  stadium began in November 2019 and is expected to be completed by December 2022. Upon completion in 2022, The stadium will become the third largest-ever cricket stadium in terms of capacity, and the most expensive cricket stadium in Asia.

In August 2019, Bangladesh Cricket Board released a notice of Expression of Interest (EOI), inviting consultancy firms to submit detailed designs and construction plans for the stadium. But the designing and construction process was delayed due to COVID-19 pandemic.

In October 2022, Australia based architectural firm Populous was awarded the contract to design and build the stadium in a 30-months timeframe.

See also
List of megaprojects in Bangladesh
Stadiums in Bangladesh

References

Purbachal
Cricket grounds in Bangladesh
Sport in Dhaka